The mixed doubles tournament at the 1987 French Open was held from 25 May until 7 June 1987 on the outdoor clay courts at the Stade Roland Garros in Paris, France. Emilio Sánchez and Pam Shriver won the title, defeating Sherwood Stewart and Lori McNeil in the final.

Draw

Finals

Top half

Section 1

Section 2

Bottom half

Section 3

Section 4

External links
1987 French Open – Doubles draws and results at the International Tennis Federation

Mixed Doubles
French Open by year – Mixed doubles